Richard Hugo Siepmann known as Hugo Siepmann ( May 24, 1868 – October 4, 1950) was a German industrialist and patron. He was a member of the Siepmann industrial family, originally hailing from Hagen, Germany known for worldwide activities in the steel, iron and coal industry. He was a majority shareholder and president of Siepmann. He was a long-time member and six year (1933-1939) president of the Chamber of Commerce and Industry (IHK). From 1939 he was appointed honorary president.

Early life and education 
Richard Hugo Siepmann was born on May 24, 1868 in Hagen, Province of Westphalia, Kingdom of Prussia, the third of six children, to Heinrich-Wilhelm Siepmann (1827-1902), originally hailing from Schwelm, and Louise (née Siepmann; 1828-1899). His father was the proprietor of the lumber wholesale company H. W. Siepmann which he operated in the second generation. This business would later be taken-over by Siepmann's eldest brother August Siepmann (1861-1894). 

Siepmann grew-up in a Evangelical family and through his fathers business relations, was able to secure a commercial apprenticeship at J.C. Söding & Halbach, a steel manufacturing company, in Hagen. He initially worked there until being deployed by his brother Emil Siepmann to lead the commercial department of Peters & Company in Warstein.

Career 

In 1892, he was deployed by his brother Emil Siepmann, who took-over the management of Peters & Company in Warstein. Their common brother-in-law bought the former Hüsing & Co plant who went into bankruptcy and continued to produce under new management and name.

Siepmann, popularly known as Schippen-Hugo, was active in the distribution of the steel products, which were mainly used in the agricultural sector. Over time, the company was completely converted to drop forging. In 1916 a new hammer was built with an 85 ton anvil. That was the heaviest hammer that existed in a production plant in Germany at the time. All bridges from Soest to Warstein had to be reinforced for its transport to Siepmann's works. The company had been an important supplier to the bicycle and later to the automobile and railroad industries since the turn of the century. Siepmann was also active as a patron in his workforce and the place. 

In 1921, the Siepmann brothers donated 250,000 marks (which would be equivalent to about 1m$ today) for the construction of the Warburg children's home, an orphanage, on the North German island of Norderney. Siepmann held numerous honorary posts and was on the Board of Directors for the Warstein Saving's Union (Sparkasse).

Personal life

Marriage 
In 1897, Siepmann married Louise Emilie Johanna (née Lämmerhirt; 1876-1962), daughter of Alfred Lämmerhirt and Emilie Schmiedt. His father in-law hailed from a well-established family of lawyers, judges and politicians in Stolberg (Harz) and was primarily known for his industrial activities in the Ruhr valley during the late 1800s. He founded the machinery factory Lämmerhirt & Brandenburg in 1872, which would ultimately turn into Westphalia Dinnendahl Gröppel (WEDAG). She was partially raised in Winterthur, Switzerland, while her father held a management position at Sulzer Brothers. Her brother Fritz Lämmerhirt had been a senior officer in the Prussian Army. The couple had three children, including Rudolf Richard Walter Siepmann known as Walter.

Residence 
Siepmann and his brother relocated to Warstein from Hagen in 1892. Initially they resided in-town and around 1900 constructed two, stately townhouses on large acreage. While Hugo and family occupied Hauptstrasse 145,  Emil resided at adjacent Hauptstrasse 143 in Warstein. His brother is the namesake for Emil-Siepmann-Strasse in the industrial section of Warstein.

Death 
Siepmann died on October 4, 1950 aged 82. His elder brother died only three weeks later, aged 87. With both patrons of the largest employer of the region a ceremonial march was held with several hundred attendees.

References

External links 

 Website of the Siepmann Group 
 Website of PERSTA

German industrialists
Businesspeople in steel
1868 births
1950 deaths